The Vietnam national under-19 and under-20 football team represents Vietnam at international youth association football competitions for age under-19 and under-20. It is administered by the Vietnam Football Federation.

International records

World stage

FIFA U-20 World Cup

Asian stage
The South Vietnam national U-20 football team represented for South Vietnam at international youth football before 1975

AFC Youth Football Championship (now AFC U-20 Asian Cup)

1959 - Did not enter

1960 - Did not enter

1961 - Fourth-Place

1962 to 1965 - Round 1

1966 - Did not enter

1967 - Quarter-Final

1968 - Round 1

1969 - Quarter-Final

1970 - Round 1

1971 - Round 1

1972 - Did not enter

1973 - Did not enter

1974 - Round 1

1975 to now - See Vietnam national under-19 football team

ASEAN regional stage

Hassanal Bolkiah Trophy

Schedule and result

2022

2023

Players
The following 23 players were called up for the 2023 AFC U-20 Asian Cup.

Coaching staff

Head coach history
Head coaches by years (2002–present)

Honours

Continental
AFC U-20 Asian Cup
 Semi-finals (1): 2016

Regional
AFF U-19 Youth Championship
 Champion (1): 2007
 Runner-up (4): 2011, 2013, 2014, 2015

Friendly
KBZ Bank Cup:
 Winners : 2016
International U-19 Thanh Niên Newspaper Cup:
 Winners : 2022

References

External links 
 

U-20
Asian national under-20 association football teams